Tormod Kristoffer Hustad (15 February 1889 – 19 August 1973) was the Norwegian minister of agriculture in the 1940 pro-Nazi puppet government of Vidkun Quisling, provisional councilor of state for agriculture in the government appointed by Reichskommissar Josef Terboven in 1940, and minister of labour in the NS government 1942–1944. He was replaced by Hans Skarphagen in 1944. In the post-war legal purges he was convicted of treason and sentenced to life imprisonment and forced labour.

References

1889 births
1973 deaths
Ministers of Agriculture and Food of Norway
Members of Nasjonal Samling
People convicted of treason for Nazi Germany against Norway
Prisoners sentenced to life imprisonment by Norway
Norwegian prisoners sentenced to life imprisonment